Jeff Lucas is a Christian author, speaker and broadcaster.

Career
Formerly a member of the Council of Management of the British Christian event Spring Harvest, Lucas has historically been linked to the Elim Pentecostal Churches, and also with the Pioneer Network, a Christian network established to "develop new churches across the UK and engage in mission globally". He was also the director of Equipped to Lead and is a former Vice President of the Evangelical Alliance. He has been a guest on Sunday Nights on ABC Radio, which noted Lucas "has had a strong impact in Evangelical, Pentecostal and Charismatic Christian circles internationally".

Lucas is a teaching pastor at Timberline Church in Fort Collins, Colorado. He also broadcasts regularly on Premier Christian Radio and UCB Radio. He contributes a monthly column for Premier Christianity magazine, the men's magazine Sorted and writes daily Bible notes for CWR – Lucas on Life Every Day. He has served as a visiting contributor to Northwest University's MA leadership program, focusing on preaching/communication.  

Lucas is an ambassador for Compassion UK, a charity working to help children in poverty worldwide. He is an accredited Life Coach with the Paterson Center, and coaches individuals and business and non-profits using the LifePlan and StratOps processes. He is also an advisor/consultant to a number of churches, including Kingsgate Community Church, C3 Church, and Christian Fellowship Church, Belfast. 

Lucas is a bestselling Christian author and has written thirty two books, as well as booklets, DVDs and study guides. His sales of products internationally have exceeded 1 million copies, and have been translated into German, Dutch, Italian, Portuguese, Korean and French.

Personal life

Jeff is married to Kay. They have homes in Southern England and in Loveland, CO.

He has two adult children, Kelly (married to Ben and living in the South of England) and Richard (married to Dana and living in Florida); and two grandsons, Stanley and Alex.

Publications

Rediscovering The Father Heart Of God (Crossway Books 1997)  (Previously published as Sweet and Sour Pork)
Friends of God (with Cleland Thom) (Crossway Books 1999)
Walking Backwards (Scripture Union Publishing 1997) 
Elijah, anointed and stressed (Chariot Victor Publishing 1998)  – later published as Going Public (Authentic) 
Lucas On Life (Authentic Media 2001)  
Lucas On Life 2 (Authentic Media 2003) 
How not to Pray (Authentic Media 2003) 
Grace Choices (Authentic Media 2004) 
Gideon: Power From Weakness (Authentic Media 2004) 
Lucas Out Loud (Authentic Media 2005) 
Will Your Prodigal Come Home (Zondervan 2007) 
 'Creating the Prodigal Friendly Church (Zondervan 2009)Helen Sloane's Diary (Authentic Media 2008) Lucas Unleashed (Authentic Media 2009) 
 'I was just wandering" (CWR)Life with Lucas 1 (CWR)Life with Lucas 2 (CWR)Life with Lucas 3 (CWR)Seriously Funny (Authentic Media 2010) (with Adrian Plass) 
 Up close and personal: what Helen did next (Authentic Media 2011)
 Seriously Funny 2 (with Adrian Plass (Authentic Media 2012)
 There Are No Strong People CWR 2012)
 Faith in the Fog Zondervan
  'Things My Grandchildren Taught Me' (CWR) The Cactus Stabbers CWRThere Are No Ordinary PeopleAll Questions Great and Small with Adrian Plass – Hodder
 It's a Dog's Life – CWR  
 If you want to walk on water, consider staying in the boat – CWR
 'Notorious' - David C Cook  
 'Specks and Planks' (CWR 2020)
 'Singing in Babylon - Finding Purpose in Life's Second Choices' David C Cook 2021 

Also Lucas on Life Every Day, bi-monthly bible reading notes (CWR)

Special products for New Christians and those interested in exploring the Christian faith, published by CWR:

Travelling Light
Life Every Day for New Christians
Life- the Journey

Life Journey DVDs and booklets

Walk on the wild side – Jonah
Elijah
Friends
Stop Looking for the will of God 
Lent 1 The Impossible Dream 
Prodigals

Other booklets (published by Verite)

Infinite Hope
Light and soul of Christmas
Y Christmas
Bun, bunnies and bunk?

ContributionsThe Read of my Life (CWR)Preach the Word'' (Sovereign World)

Awards and nominations

Christian Life Book of the Year UK 2018: It's a Dog's Life (won)
Christian Life Book of the Year UK 2019: Staying in the Boat (nominated)
Eden Author of the Year 2018: (won)
Media Product of the Year (film) There are no strong people (won)
Christian Life Book of the Year - The Cactus Stabbers (nominated)
Christian Life Book of the Year 2021 - Singing in Babylon - (won)

References

External links
 jefflucas.org - Lucas' official web site
 @Jeffreylucas - Lucas' Twitter account

Year of birth missing (living people)
Living people
American male writers
American clergy